Crûg Farm Quarry is a Site of Special Scientific Interest (SSSI) in Carmarthenshire, Wales, for the geological records preserved in its limestone.

SSSI

The SSSI citation for Crûg Farm Quarry identifies the geology of the site as having aspects unique in Britain. The shelly limestone rock is of the  Upper Ordovician stratum, sufficiently rich in fossils of trilobites to be considered a reference site; and exhibiting also brachiopods, conodonts, and echinoderm fragments.

See also
List of Sites of Special Scientific Interest in Carmarthenshire

References

External links
SSSI Citation for Crûg Farm Quarry
Citation map for Crûg Farm Quarry
Your Special Site and its Future - Crûg Farm Quarry SSSI overview from Natural Resources Wales
Crûg Farm Quarry SSSI marked on DEFRA's MAGIC Map

Quarries in Wales
Sites of Special Scientific Interest in Carmarthen & Dinefwr